Trail Creek may refer to
 Trail Creek, Indiana, a town in northern Indiana
 Trail Creek (Lake Michigan), a creek in northern Indiana which discharges into Lake Michigan
 Trail Creek (Rogue River tributary), a stream in Oregon
 Trail Creek, Alaska
 Trail Creek Course, a golf course in Sun Valley, Idaho